Vitthal Teedi is an Indian Gujarati-language drama web-series directed by Abhishek Jain. It is streamed on OHO Gujarati and stars Pratik Gandhi as the protagonist Vitthal Teedi. The first season, stylized as Chapter 1, was released on 7 May 2021. It was reviewed positively for performance, direction, production, music and script.

Premise

Vitthal Tripathi is portrayed as a person from humble origins who has exceptional skill with playing cards, which he uses to enter the big leagues and experience city life.

Cast
 Pratik Gandhi as Vitthal Tripathi/Vitthal Teedi
 Ragi Jani as Tribhuvandas Tripathi
 Prashant Barot as Dasha Bapu
 Prem Gadhvi as Kanu Datti
 Brinda Trivedi as  Vandana Tripathi
 Jagjeetsinh Vadher as Jaglo
 Shraddha Dangar as Manisha
 Vishal Thakkar as Young Vitthal Tripathi
 Bhavya Sirohi as Young Vandana Tripathi

Episodes

Chapter 1

Production
The show is based on an eponymous Gujarati short story by Mukesh Sojitra. The story is set in the Saurashtra region of Gujarat in the 1980s. The series was shot in various villages in Gir and in Ahmedabad. The first six episodes were shot in 16 days in January 2021.

Soundtrack

Chapter 1
Traditional lyrics (specifically, Chhand, used in the song) for "Vitthal Vitthal" are credited to Dula Bhaya Kag. Rolling Stone India rated the soundtrack positively, calling it an "enchanting folk soundtrack".

Release
The trailer was released on 1 May 2021. All episodes of the Chapter 1  were released on OHO Gujarati, a Gujarati streaming platform, on 7 May 2021.

Reception
The series received positive reviews. Koimoi rated it 4 out of 5 stars saying, "Vitthal Teedi has all the elements to become a complete package, and the makers have to realise that. You should give it a try because the cast won’t let you get bored for a single moment." Keyur Seta of Cinestaan reviewed it three out of four starts. Vishal Verma of Glamsham also praised performances, production and direction. Subhash K. Jha of SpotboyE also rated it three out of five stars.

Notes

References

External links

2021 Indian television series debuts
Indian web series
Television series based on short fiction
Television shows filmed in Asia
Television shows set in Gujarat